

2018–19 NCAA football bowl games
 December 15, 2018 – January 7, 2019: 2018–19 NCAA football bowl games

2018–19 College Football Playoff and Championship Game
 December 29, 2018: 2018 Peach Bowl in Atlanta at Mercedes-Benz Stadium
 The Florida Gators defeated the Michigan Wolverines, with the score of 41–15.
 December 29, 2018: 2018 Orange Bowl in Miami Gardens at Hard Rock Stadium
 The Alabama Crimson Tide defeated the Oklahoma Sooners, with the score of 45–34.
 December 29, 2018: 2018 Cotton Bowl Classic in Arlington at AT&T Stadium
 The Clemson Tigers defeated the Notre Dame Fighting Irish, with the score of 30–3.
 January 1: 2019 Fiesta Bowl in Glendale at University of Phoenix Stadium
 The LSU Tigers defeated the UCF Knights, with the score of 40–32.
 January 1: 2019 Rose Bowl in Pasadena at Rose Bowl
 The Ohio State Buckeyes defeated the Washington Huskies, with the score of 28–23.
 January 1: 2019 Sugar Bowl in New Orleans at Mercedes-Benz Superdome
 The Texas Longhorns defeated the Georgia Bulldogs, with the score of 28–21.
 January 7: 2019 College Football Playoff National Championship in Santa Clara at Levi's Stadium
 The Clemson Tigers defeated the Alabama Crimson Tide, 44–16, to win their third College Football Playoff National Championship title.

2018–19 Non-CFP bowl games
 December 15, 2018: 2018 New Mexico Bowl in Albuquerque at Dreamstyle Stadium
 The Utah State Aggies defeated the North Texas Mean Green, with the score of 52–13.
 December 15, 2018: 2018 Cure Bowl in Orlando at Camping World Stadium
 The Tulane Green Wave defeated the Louisiana Ragin' Cajuns, with the score of 41–24.
 December 15, 2018: 2018 Las Vegas Bowl in Las Vegas at Sam Boyd Stadium
 The Fresno State Bulldogs defeated the Arizona State Sun Devils, with the score of 31–20.
 December 15, 2018: 2018 Camellia Bowl in Montgomery at Cramton Bowl
 The Georgia Southern Eagles defeated the Eastern Michigan Eagles, with the score of 23–21.
 December 15, 2018: 2018 New Orleans Bowl in New Orleans at Mercedes-Benz Superdome
 The Appalachian State Mountaineers defeated the Middle Tennessee Blue Raiders, with the score of 45–13.
 December 18, 2018: 2018 Boca Raton Bowl in Boca Raton at FAU Stadium
 The UAB Blazers defeated the Northern Illinois Huskies, with the score of 37–13.
 December 19, 2018: 2018 Frisco Bowl in Frisco at Toyota Stadium
 The Ohio Bobcats defeated the San Diego State Aztecs, with the score of 27–0.
 December 20, 2018: 2018 Gasparilla Bowl in Tampa at Raymond James Stadium
 The Marshall Thundering Herd defeated the South Florida Bulls, with the score of 38–20.
 December 21, 2018: 2018 Bahamas Bowl in Nassau at Thomas Robinson Stadium
 The FIU Panthers defeated the Toledo Rockets, with the score of 35–32.
 December 21, 2018: 2018 Famous Idaho Potato Bowl in Boise at Albertsons Stadium
 The BYU Cougars defeated the Western Michigan Broncos, with the score of 49–18.
 December 22, 2018: 2018 Birmingham Bowl in Birmingham at Legion Field
 The Wake Forest Demon Deacons defeated the Memphis Tigers, with the score of 37–34.
 December 22, 2018: 2018 Armed Forces Bowl in Fort Worth at Amon G. Carter Stadium
 The Army Black Knights defeated the Houston Cougars, 70–14, with the Black Knights tying records for most points scored and largest victory margin in any bowl game.
 December 22, 2018: 2018 Dollar General Bowl in Mobile at Ladd–Peebles Stadium
 The Troy Trojans defeated the Buffalo Bulls, with the score of 42–32.
 December 22, 2018: 2018 Hawaii Bowl in Honolulu at Aloha Stadium
 The Louisiana Tech Bulldogs defeated the Hawaii Rainbow Warriors, with the score of 31–14.
 December 26, 2018: 2018 First Responder Bowl in Dallas at Cotton Bowl
 No contest between the Boston College Eagles and the Boise State Broncos, due to unfavorable weather conditions.
 December 26, 2018: 2018 Quick Lane Bowl in Detroit at Ford Field
 The Minnesota Golden Gophers defeated the Georgia Tech Yellow Jackets, with the score of 34–10.
 December 26, 2018: 2018 Cheez-It Bowl in Phoenix at Chase Field
 The TCU Horned Frogs defeated the California Golden Bears, with the score of 10–7 in overtime.
 December 27, 2018: 2018 Independence Bowl in Shreveport at Independence Stadium
 The Duke Blue Devils defeated the Temple Owls, with the score of 56–27.
 December 27, 2018: 2018 Pinstripe Bowl in The Bronx at Yankee Stadium
 The Wisconsin Badgers defeated the Miami Hurricanes, with the score of 35–3.
 December 27, 2018: 2018 Texas Bowl in Houston at NRG Stadium
 The Baylor Bears defeated the Vanderbilt Commodores, with the score of 45–38.
 December 28, 2018: 2018 Music City Bowl in Nashville at Nissan Stadium
 The Auburn Tigers defeated the Purdue Boilermakers, with the score of 63–14.
 December 28, 2018: 2018 Camping World Bowl in Orlando at Camping World Stadium
 The Syracuse Orange defeated the West Virginia Mountaineers, with the score of 34–18.
 December 28, 2018: 2018 Alamo Bowl in San Antonio at Alamodome
 The Washington State Cougars defeated the Iowa State Cyclones, with the score of 28–26.
 December 29, 2018: 2018 Belk Bowl in Charlotte at Bank of America Stadium
 The Virginia Cavaliers defeated the South Carolina Gamecocks, with the score of 28–0.
 December 29, 2018: 2018 Arizona Bowl in Tucson at Arizona Stadium
 The Nevada Wolf Pack defeated the Arkansas State Red Wolves, with the score of 16–13.
 December 31, 2018: 2018 Redbox Bowl in Santa Clara at Levi's Stadium
 The Oregon Ducks defeated the Michigan State Spartans, with the score of 7–6.
 December 31, 2018: 2018 Holiday Bowl in San Diego at SDCCU Stadium
 The Northwestern Wildcats defeated the Utah Utes, with the score of 31–20.
 December 31, 2018: 2018 Military Bowl in Annapolis at Navy–Marine Corps Memorial Stadium
 The Cincinnati Bearcats defeated the Virginia Tech Hokies, with the score of 35–31.
 December 31, 2018: 2018 Sun Bowl in El Paso at Sun Bowl
 The Stanford Cardinal defeated the Pittsburgh Panthers, with the score of 14–13.
 December 31, 2018: 2018 Liberty Bowl in Memphis at Liberty Bowl Memorial Stadium
 The Oklahoma State Cowboys defeated the Missouri Tigers, with the score of 38–33.
 December 31, 2018: 2018 Gator Bowl in Jacksonville at TIAA Bank Field
 The Texas A&M Aggies defeated the NC State Wolfpack, with the score of 52–13.
 January 1, 2019: 2019 Outback Bowl in Tampa at Raymond James Stadium
 The Iowa Hawkeyes defeated the Mississippi State Bulldogs, with the score of 27–22.
 January 1, 2019: 2019 Citrus Bowl in Orlando at Camping World Stadium
 The Kentucky Wildcats defeated the Penn State Nittany Lions, with the score of 27–24.

National Football League
 January 27: 2019 Pro Bowl in Orlando at Camping World Stadium
 Team AFC defeated team NFC, with the score of 26–7.
 Offensive MVP: Patrick Mahomes (Kansas City Chiefs)
 Defensive MVP: Jamal Adams (New York Jets)
 February 3: Super Bowl LIII in Atlanta at Mercedes-Benz Stadium
 The New England Patriots defeated the Los Angeles Rams, 13–3, to win their sixth Super Bowl title.
 MVP: Julian Edelman (New England Patriots)
 April 25–27: 2019 NFL Draft in Nashville
 #1 pick: Kyler Murray (to the Arizona Cardinals from the Oklahoma Sooners)
 September 5 – December 29: 2019 NFL season

IFAF
 July 29 – August 4: 2019 IFAF European U-19 American Football Championships in Bologna
  defeated , 28–0, in the final.  took third place.
 August 11–18: 2019 IFAF Women's European American Football Championships in Leeds
  defeated , 18–14, in the final.  took third place.
 August 29 – September 1: 2019 IFAF European Flag Championships in Jerusalem
 Winners: Denmark (m) / Spain (f)

Other notable events
February 9: Alliance of American Football launches and disbands (2019 AAF season)
November 27: Arena Football League disbands (2019 Arena Football League season)

Deaths

 January 2
 Jerry Magee, sportswriter (b. 1928)
 Jim Margraff, coach (b. 1960)
 George Welsh, coach (b. 1933)
 January 3 – William Miller, player (b. 1956)
 January 5 – Pete Manning, player (b. 1937)
 January 6
 Roy Hilton, player (b. 1943)
 Kwamie Lassiter, player (b. 1969)
 January 10
 Rick Forzano, coach (b. 1928)
 John Michels, player and coach (b. 1931)
 January 12 – Bob Kuechenberg, player (b. 1947)
 January 15 – Tim Maypray, player (b. 1988)
 January 16 – Hank Norton, coach (b. 1927)
 January 17 
 Joe O'Donnell, player (b. 1941)
 Turk Schonert, player (b. 1956)
 January 18
 Dan Orlich, player (b. 1924)
 William A. Thomas, player and coach (b. 1948)
 January 22 – Bill Mackrides, player (b. 1925)
 January 26 – Duane Benson, player (b. 1945)
 February 1
 Glen Ray Hines, player (b. 1943)
 Wade Wilson, player and coach (b. 1958)
 February 8 – Dick Kempthorn, player (b. 1926)
 February 11 – Lou Sossamon, player (b. 1921)
 February 16 – Shelly Saltman, 1982 NFL Players Association promoter (b. 1931)
 February 18 – T. J. Cunningham, player (b. 1972)
 February 25 – Fred Gloden, player (b. 1918)
 March 2 – Jack Gregory, player (b. 1944)
 March 7 – Dan Jenkins, sportswriter (b. 1928)
 March 8 – Cedrick Hardman, player (b. 1948)
 March 9 – Joe Auer, player (b. 1941)
 March 10
 Russell Gary, player (b. 1959)
 Eric Moss, player (b. 1974)
 March 21 – Anthony Dickerson, player (b. 1957)
 March 23 – Clem Daniels, player (b. 1937)
 March 27 – Joe Bellino, player (b. 1938)
 April 8 – Blase Bonpane, player (b. 1929)
 April 17 – Chet Coppock, broadcast journalist and sports talk personality (b. 1948)
 April 20 – Reggie Cobb, player (b. 1968)
 April 24 – Johnny Green, player (b. 1937)
 April 29 – Gino Marchetti, player (b. 1925)
 May 2 – Larry Dick, 64, player.
 May 3
 Bill Gompers, 91, player
 Bob Zeman, 82, player and coach
 May 4 – MacArthur Lane, 77, player
 May 6 – Jimmy Satterfield, coach (b. 1939)
 May 10 – Dick Tomey, coach (b. 1938)
 May 16 – Bob Schloredt, player and coach (b. 1939)
 May 18 – John Payne, coach (b. 1932)
 May 19 – George Chaump, player and coach (b. 1935)
 May 23 – , high school coach (T. C. Williams High School), depicted in Remember the Titans (b. 1924)
 May 25 – Rod Bramblett, sportscaster (b. 1965)
 May 26 – Bart Starr, player and coach (b. 1934)
 May 28 – Horace Belton, player (b. 1955)
 June 8 – Eric Patterson, player (b. 1993)
 June 13 – Pat Bowlen, team owner (b. 1944)
 June 23 – Jack Rudolph, player (b. 1938)
 June 25 – Ken Behring, team owner (b. 1928)
 July 3 – Jared Lorenzen, player (b. 1981)
 July 4 – Wayne Mass, player (b. 1946)
 July 7 – Bob Fouts, sportscaster (b. 1921)
 July 10 – Walt Michaels, player and coach (b. 1929)
 July 14 – Mike Maser, coach (b. 1947)
 July 16 – Adam Bob, player (b. 1967)
 July 18 – Mitch Petrus, player (b. 1987)
 July 19 – Bert Rechichar, player (b. 1930)
 July 27 – Keith Lincoln, player (b. 1939)
 July 29 – Max Falkenstien, sportscaster (b. 1924)
 July 30 – Nick Buoniconti, player (b. 1940)
 August 1 – Jack Dolbin, player (b. 1948)
 August 3 – Cliff Branch, player (b. 1948)
 August 8 – Dave Parks, player (b. 1941)
 August 11 – Darryl Drake, player and coach (b. 1956)
 August 16 
 Jim Hardy, player (b. 1923)
 Mike McGee, player, coach and athletic director (b. 1938)
 August 17 – Cedric Benson, player (b. 1982)
 August 18 – Jack Whitaker, sportscaster (b. 1924)
 August 19 – Barry Bennett, player (b. 1955)
 August 22 – Bobby Dillon, player (b. 1930)
 August 24 – Dick Woodard, player (b. 1926)
 August 28 – Donnie Green, player (b. 1948)
 August 29 – Jim Langer, player (b. 1948)
 August 31 – Jeff Blackshear, player (b. 1969)
 September 7 – Al Carmichael, player (b. 1928)
 September 9 – Neiron Ball, player (b. 1992)
 September 10
 Sam Davis, player (b. 1944)
 Billy Stacy, player (b. 1936)
 September 11 
 Terrell Roberts, player (b. 1981)
 Joe Scudero, player (b. 1930)
 September 14 
 Larry Garron, player (b. 1937)
 John Ralston, coach (b. 1927)
 September 20 
 Howard Cassady, player (b. 1934)
 Jan Merlin, actor (b. 1925)
 September 21
 Tommy Brooker, player (b. 1939)
 E. J. Holub, player (b. 1938)
 Jevan Snead, player (b. 1987)
 September 22 – Wally Chambers, player (b. 1951)
 October 1 – Ed Simonini, player (b. 1954)
 October 2 – Bill Bidwill, team owner (b. 1931)
 October 8 – Chip Healy, player (b. 1947)
 October 18 – Mike Reilly, player (b. 1942)
 October 21 – Willie Brown, player (b. 1940)
 October 22 – George Brancato, player and coach (b. 1931)
 October 23 – Bernie Parrish, player (b. 1936)
 October 29 – Charlie Taaffe, coach (b. 1950)
 October 30 – Sam Jankovich, coach and athletic director (b. 1934)
 November 4 
 Jim LeClair, player (b. 1950)
 Virginia Leith, actress (b. 1925)
 November 7 – Dan McGrew, player (b. 1937)
 November 9 – Yusuf Scott, player (b. 1976)
 November 11
 Zeke Bratkowski, player (b. 1931)
 Charles Rogers, player (b. 1981)
 November 20 – Fred Cox, player (b. 1938)
 November 22 – Warren Wolf, coach (b. 1927)
 November 24 – Hank Bullough, player and coach (b. 1934)
 November 28 – John McKissick, coach (b. 1926)
 November 29
 Seymour Siwoff, sports statistician and businessman (b. 1920)
 R-Kal Truluck, player (b. 1974)
 December 1 – Paul Sullivan, player and coach (b. 1950)
 December 2 – George Atkinson III, player (b. 1992)
 December 4 – Cas Banaszek, player (b. 1945)
 December 5 – Sherman Howard, player (b. 1924)
 December 7 – Bump Elliott, player, coach, and athletic director (b. 1925)
 December 9
 Leon Hardeman, player (b. 1932)
 Chuck Heberling, sports administrator and referee (b. 1925)
 December 12 – Vaughan Johnson, player (b. 1962)
 December 17 – Hayden Fry, player and coach (b. 1929)
 December 18 – Herman Boone, coach (b. 1935)
 December 24 – Rusty Hilger, player (b. 1962)
 December 26 – Elbert Dubenion, player (b. 1933)
 December 28 – Carley Ann McCord, sports journalist (b. 1989)

References

External links
 National Football League
 International Federation of American Football

 
2019 sport-related lists